The Shardlake series is a series of historical mystery novels by C. J. Sansom, set in the reign of Henry VIII in the 16th century.

Sansom has said that he plans to write further Shardlake novels taking the lawyer into the reign of Elizabeth I.

Description
The series' protagonist is the hunchbacked lawyer Matthew Shardlake, who is assisted in his adventures by Mark Poer and then Jack Barak. Shardlake works on commission initially from Thomas Cromwell in Dissolution and Dark Fire, Archbishop Thomas Cranmer in Sovereign and Revelation, Queen Catherine Parr in Heartstone and Lamentation, and Princess Elizabeth in Tombland. The seventh book, Tombland, was published in October 2018. An eighth book, Ratcliff, will be published in August 2023.

Principal Characters

Fictional

Matthew Shardlake - A barrister of Lincoln's Inn, the main character and narrator of the series. 

Jack Barak - Formerly Thomas Cromwell's man, who later came to work for Shardlake after Cromwell's execution.

Guy Malton - Formerly a monk at a monastery at Sussex; came to London after the dissolution of the monasteries to practice as an apothecary, later as a physician. Because of his skin colour, he was a target for racial discrimination.

Tamasin Reedbourne - A junior servant who worked for Queen Catherine Howard; when Queen Catherine was executed, she became Barak's wife

Stephen Bealknap - Shardlake's greatest enemy; also a barrister of Lincoln's Inn.

Dorothy Ellirad - wife of Shardlake's best friend, Roger Ellirad.

Roger Ellirad - Shardlake's best friend and fellow lawyer. 

Ellen   - a woman who came originally from a small town in Sussex, she had been living in Bedlam, a lunatic asylum in London, for nearly two decades.

Characters who existed in real life

Henry VIII - King of England.

Thomas Cromwell - Shardlake and Barak's patron and principal counsellor to the king.

Thomas Cranmer - Archbishop of Canterbury

Catherine Parr - Last and sixth wife of Henry VIII; Queen of England

Richard Rich - A member of the Privy Council and Shardlake's arch enemy.

Novels

Adaptations

Radio
BBC Radio 4 has adapted novels in the Shardlake series as part of its 15-Minute Drama series. In 2012, Dissolution was adapted into a 10-part radio serial by Colin MacDonald, starring Jason Watkins as Shardlake and Mark Bonnar as Cromwell. BBC Radio 4 later broadcast Dark Fire in 2014, with Justin Salinger taking over the role of Shardlake and Bryan Dick playing Barak, Sovereign in 2015, Revelation in 2017, Heartstone in 2018, and Lamentation in 2021, all adapted by Colin MacDonald as 10-part serials.

Television
In 2007, the BBC commissioned an adaptation of Dissolution, with Kenneth Branagh set to star as Shardlake. Branagh chose instead to star as the eponymous protagonist in the BBC series Wallander.

In 2023, Disney+ greenlit an adaptation of the Shardlake novels. The series will consist of four episodes, and will be directed by Justin Chadwick.

References

External links

Book series introduced in 2003
Novels by C. J. Sansom
Cultural depictions of Henry VIII
Mystery novels by series
Novels adapted into radio programs
Fictional historical detectives
British novels adapted into television shows